Timothy S. McGinley (born 1854 in Philadelphia – November 2, 1899 in Oakland, California), was a Major League Baseball player who played catcher from -. He would play for the Philadelphia Centennials, New Haven Elm Citys, and Boston Red Caps.

On April 22, 1876, McGinley recorded the first run in MLB history.

References

External links

1899 deaths
Major League Baseball catchers
Philadelphia Centennials players
New Haven Elm Citys players
Boston Red Caps players
19th-century baseball players
1854 births
Baseball players from Philadelphia